"Diamond Hard" is a song performed by Estonian singer Kerli. It was released on July 27, 2016 as a single included in Kerli's third extended play, Deepest Roots (2016). The song is about resilience and self-empowerment. An EP containing four remixes of the song was made available on November 16, 2016 on iTunes.

Music video 
The music video marked Kerli's debut as director. The music video debuted the same day of the single release.

Composition 
"Diamond Hard" runs at a moderate tempo of 90 beats per minute. Musically, it incorporates heavy electronic beats, hits, and strings. Lyrically, it deals with resilience and self-empowerment.

Track listing

Digital download 

1. "Diamond Hard" 4:01

Remixes EP 

1. "Diamond Hard (Reuben Keeney Remix)" 4:42

2. "Diamond Hard (Curt Reynolds Remix)" 2:58

3. "Diamond Hard (Flinch Remix)" 4:12

4. "Diamond Hard (Akcent Remix)" 3:09

References 

Kerli songs
2016 songs